Listed here are the world's airports used as airline hubs:

Africa

Algeria
Algiers
Air Algérie
Aigle Azur
Tassili Airlines
Hassi Messaoud
Tassili Airlines
Air Express Algeria
Star Aviation
Oran
Aigle Azur
Air Algerie

Angola
Luanda
Fly Angola
TAAG Angola Airlines
Diexim Expresso
SonAir

Benin
Cotonou
Benin Golf Air
Westair Benin

Botswana
Gaborone
Air Botswana

Burkina Faso
Ouagadougou
Air Burkina

Burundi
Bujumbura
Air Burundi

Cameroon
Douala
Camair-co
Yaoundé
Elysian Airlines
Section Liaison Air Yaoundé
National Airways Cameroon

Cape Verde
Espargos
Cabo Verde Express
Halcyonair
TACV
Praia
TACV
São Pedro
TACV

Chad
N'Djamena
Toumaï Air Tchad

Comoros
Moroni
Comores Aviation

Republic of the Congo
Brazzaville
Equatorial Congo Airlines

Côte d'Ivoire (Ivory Coast)
Abidjan
Air Côte d'Ivoire

Djibouti
Djibouti
Daallo Airlines

Egypt
Alexandria
EgyptAir
Air Arabia Egypt
AlMasria Universal Airlines
Cairo
Air Cairo
AlMasria Universal Airlines
AMC Airlines
EgyptAir
EgyptAir Express
Nile Air
Nesma Airlines
Midwest Airlines
Alexandria Airlines
Hurghada
Air Cairo
Sharm el-Sheikh
Air Cairo
EgyptAir Express

Eritrea
Asmara
Eritrean Airlines

Ethiopia
Addis Ababa
Ethiopian Airlines

Gabon
Libreville
Nationale Regionale Transport
Sky Gabon

(The) Gambia
Banjul
Gambia Bird

Ghana
Accra
Africa World Airlines
Starbow Airlines
Antrak Air

Guinea
Conakry
Elysian Airlines

Kenya
Nairobi-Jomo Kenyatta
Fly540
Kenya Airways
Wilson Airport
Airkenya Express
Safarilink Aviation

Libya
Tripoli
Afriqiyah Airways
Libyan Airlines
Buraq Air

Madagascar
Antananarivo
Air Madagascar

Mauritania
Nouakchott
Mauritania Airlines International

Mauritius
Port Louis
Air Mauritius

Morocco
Casablanca
Jetairfly
Royal Air Maroc
Royal Air Maroc Express
Air Arabia
Marrakech
Atlas Blue
Tangier
RAM Express

Mozambique
Maputo
Kaya Airlines
LAM Mozambique Airlines
Moçambique Expresso

Nigeria
Lagos
Aero Contractors (Nigeria)
Med-View Airline
Chanchangi Airlines
Arik Air
Abuja
IRS Airlines
Arik Air
Overland Airways

Rwanda
Kigali
RwandAir

Senegal
Dakar
Sénégal Airlines

Seychelles
Mahe Island
Air Seychelles

Sierra Leone
Freetown
Fly 6ix

South Africa
Johannesburg-OR Tambo
South African Airways
Airlink
South African Express
Mango
Johannesburg-Lanseria 
Solenta Aviation
Cape Town
South African Express
Mango
Durban
South African Express

South Sudan
Juba
Feeder Airlines
Southern Star Airlines

Sudan
Khartoum
Sudan Airways
Marsland Aviation

Tanzania
Dar es Salaam (DAR)
Air Tanzania
Precision Air
Coastal Aviation
Kilimanjaro
Precision Air
Mwanza (MWZ)
 Air Tanzania
Zanzibar (Zanzibar International Airport)
ZanAir

Togo
Lomé
ASKY Airlines

Tunisia
Tunis
Tunisair
TunisAir Express
Syphax Airlines
Sfax
Syphax Airlines

Uganda
Kampala
Air Uganda
Eagle Air
Royal Daisy Airlines
Uganda Airlines

Zimbabwe
Harare
Air Zimbabwe

Zambia
Lusaka
Proflight Zambia
Zambezi Airlines

Asia

Central Asia

Afghanistan
Kabul
Ariana Afghan Airlines
Kam Air
Kandahar
Ariana Afghan Airlines

Kazakhstan
Aktau
SCAT
Almaty
Air Astana
SCAT
Astana
Air Astana

Kyrgyzstan
Bishkek
Kyrgyzstan

Tajikistan
Dushanbe
Somon Air
Tajik Air

Turkmenistan
Ashgabat
Turkmenistan Airlines

Uzbekistan
Tashkent
Uzbekistan Airways

East Asia

China (Mainland)
Beijing-Capital (PEK)
Air China
Hainan Airlines
Beijing-Daxing (PKX)
Air China
China Eastern Airlines
China Southern Airlines
China United Airlines
XiamenAir
Chengdu (CTU)
Air China
Chengdu Airlines
Sichuan Airlines
Chongqing (CKG)
Chongqing Airlines
China Southern Airlines
Sichuan Airlines
Fuzhou (FOC)
Xiamen Airlines
Guangzhou (CAN)
9 Air
China Southern Airlines
FedEx
Shanghai-Hongqiao (SHA)
China Eastern Airlines
Shanghai Airlines
Shanghai-Pudong (PVG)
Air China
China Southern Airlines
China Eastern Airlines
Juneyao Airlines
Shanghai Airlines
Spring Airlines
Shenzhen (SZX)
Shenzhen Airlines
SF Airlines
Xi'an (XIY)
China Eastern Airlines
Hainan Airlines
Shenzhen Airlines

Hong Kong
Hong Kong (HKG)
Cathay Pacific
Air Hong Kong
Hong Kong Airlines
HK Express

Japan
Tokyo-Haneda (HND)
Air Do
All Nippon Airways
Japan Airlines
Skymark Airlines
Solaseed Air
StarFlyer
Osaka-Kansai (KIX)
All Nippon Airways
FedEx Express
Japan Airlines
Nippon Cargo Airlines
Peach
Tokyo-Narita (NRT)
All Nippon Airways
Japan Airlines
Jetstar Japan
Nippon Cargo Airlines
Peach
Polar Air Cargo
Spring Airlines Japan
Zipair Tokyo
Osaka-Itami (ITM)
All Nippon Airways
Japan Airlines

South Korea
Seoul-Incheon (ICN)
Asiana Airlines
Eastar Jet
Jeju Air
Jin Air
Korean Air
T'way Airlines
Polar Air Cargo
Busan (PUS)
Air Busan
Korean Air
Asiana Airlines
Seoul-Gimpo (GMP)
Asiana Airlines
Korean Air

Macau
Macau (MFM)
Air Macau

Mongolia
Ulaanbaatar (ULN)
MIAT Mongolian Airlines

Taiwan
Taipei-Taoyuan (TPE)
China Airlines
EVA Air
Tigerair Taiwan
UNI Air
Taipei-Songshan
Far Eastern Air
China Airlines
EVA Air
Mandarin Airlines
UNI Air
Kaohsiung City (KHH)
UNI Air
Taichung City (RMQ)
Mandarin Airlines

South Asia

Bangladesh
Dhaka (DAC)
Biman Bangladesh Airlines
United Airways
Regent Airways
NovoAir
Chittagong (CGP)
Biman Bangladesh Airlines
United Airways
NovoAir
Sylhet (ZYL)
Biman Bangladesh Airlines

India
Delhi
AirAsia India
Air India
Vistara
IndiGo
Deccan 360
SpiceJet
GoAir
 Mumbai
AirAsia India
Air India
Vistara
Deccan 360
GoAir
IndiGo
Bangalore
Blue Dart Aviation
IndiGo
Deccan Aviation
Alliance Air
 Kolkata
Air Deccan 
Air India
Alliance Air
Air Asia India
Blue Dart Aviation
GoAir
IndiGo
 Chennai
 Blue Dart Aviation
 IndiGo
 Alliance Air
 Hyderabad
SpiceJet
Lufthansa Cargo
IndiGo

Maldives
Malé
Maldivian (airline)

Nepal
Kathmandu
Nepal Airlines
BB Airways
Buddha Air
Yeti Airlines
Gorkha Airlines
Sita Air
Tara Air
Pokhara
Gorkha Airlines
Sita Air
Nepalgunj
Tara Air

Pakistan
Karachi
PIA (Pakistan International)
Aero Asia
Airblue
Lahore
PIA (Pakistan International)
Islamabad
PIA (Pakistan International)

Sri Lanka
Colombo
Cinnamon Air
Millennium Airlines
Sri Lankan Airlines
Sri Lankan Cargo
Hambantota
Helitours
Sri Lankan Airlines
SriLankan Cargo

Southeast Asia

Brunei
Brunei International Airport (BWN)
Royal Brunei Airlines

Indonesia
Jakarta-Soekarno-Hatta
Batik Air
Citilink
Garuda Indonesia
Indonesia AirAsia
Lion Air
NAM Air
Sriwijaya Air
Surabaya
Citilink
Garuda Indonesia
Lion Air
Sriwijaya Air
Denpasar, Bali
Garuda Indonesia
Indonesia AirAsia
Lion Air
Wings Air
Makassar
Garuda Indonesia
Lion Air
Sriwijaya Air
Wings Air
Jakarta-Halim Perdanakusuma
Batik Air
Citilink
Medan
Garuda Indonesia
Indonesia AirAsia
Lion Air
Wings Air
Bandung
Indonesia AirAsia
Lion Air
Wings Air
Mataram
Indonesia AirAsia

Malaysia
Senai
AirAsia
Kota Kinabalu
AirAsia
Malaysia Airlines
MASwings
Kuching
AirAsia
Malaysia Airlines
MASwings
Kuala Lumpur-International (KUL)
AirAsia
AirAsia X
Malaysia Airlines
Batik Air Malaysia
Miri
MASwings
Penang (PEN)
AirAsia
Firefly
Kuala Lumpur-Subang (SZB)
Firefly
Batik Air Malaysia

Philippines
Luzon
Clark
Cebgo
Cebu Pacific
Philippine Airlines
Manila
Cebgo
Cebu Pacific
Philippine Airlines
Philippines AirAsia
PAL Express
Visayas
Iloilo
Cebu Pacific
Kalibo
Cebu Pacific
Lapu-Lapu
Philippine Airlines
Cebu Pacific
Mindanao
 Cagayan de Oro
 Cebgo
Davao
Cebu Pacific
PAL Express
Philippine Airlines
Philippines AirAsia
 Zamboanga
 PAL Express

Singapore
Singapore (SIN)
Jetstar Asia
Singapore Airlines
Scoot

Thailand
Bangkok-Suvarnabhumi (BKK)
Thai Airways International
Thai Smile
Bangkok Airways
Thai Vietjet Air
Thai AirAsia
Bangkok-Don Mueang (DMK)
Nok Air
Thai AirAsia
Thai AirAsia X
Thai Lion Air
Chiang Mai (CNX)
Thai Airways International
Kan Air
Thai Smile
Phuket HKT
Thai Airways International
Thai AirAsia
Thai Smile
Ko Samui (USM)
Bangkok Airways

Vietnam
Hanoi (HAN)
VietJet Air
Vietnam Airlines
Saigon - Ho Chi Minh City (SGN)
Pacific Airlines
VietJet Air
Vietnam Airlines
VASCO

Southwest Asia

Bahrain
Manama (BAH)
Gulf Air

Iran
Tehran-Imam Khomeini
Iran Air
Mahan Air
Kish Air
Caspian Airlines
Tehran Tehran-Mehrabad
Iran Air
Iran Asseman Airlines
Mahan Air
Caspian Airlines
Saha Airlines
Taban Airlines
Aria Air
Mashhad
Iran Air Tours
Shiraz
Iran Air
Iran Asseman Airlines
Kish Island
Kish Air

Israel
Tel Aviv
Arkia Israel Airlines
El Al
Israir Airlines

Jordan
Amman
Royal Jordanian

Lebanon
Beirut
Middle East Airlines

Oman
 Muscat
 Oman Air

Qatar
Doha
Qatar Airways

Saudi Arabia
Riyadh
Saudia
Nas Air
Jeddah
Saudia
Nas Air
Flyadeal 
Dammam
Saudia
Saudi Gulf Airlines

United Arab Emirates
Abu Dhabi (AUH)
Etihad
Dubai (DXB)
Emirates
Flydubai
Sharjah (SHJ)
Air Arabia

Europe

North America

Canada

Alberta
Calgary (YYC)
Air Canada
Canadian Airlines (defunct)
Canadian Pacific Air Lines (defunct)
Pacific Western Airlines (defunct)
WestJet
Edmonton (YEG)
Canadian North
Flair Airlines
Canadian Pacific Air Lines (defunct)
Pacific Western Airlines (defunct)

British Columbia
Vancouver (YVR)
Air Canada
Canadian Airlines (defunct)
Canadian Pacific Air Lines (defunct)
Pacific Western Airlines (defunct)
WestJet

Northwest Territories
 Yellowknife
 Canadian North
 First Air (defunct)

Nova Scotia
 Halifax (YHZ)
 Jazz

Nunavut
 Iqaluit
 First Air (defunct)

Ontario
North Bay (YYB)
Voyageur Airways
Ottawa (YOW)
Air Canada
Toronto-Pearson (YYZ)
Air Canada
Canadian Airlines (defunct)
Canadian Pacific Air Lines (defunct)
WestJet
Toronto Island (Toronto City Centre Airport, Toronto Island Airport) (YTZ)
Porter Airlines

Québec
Montreal (YUL)
Air Canada
Air Transat
Canadian Airlines (defunct)
Canadian Pacific Air Lines (defunct)
Nordair (defunct)

Mexico

Mexico City
Mexico City (MEX)
Aeromar
Aeroméxico
Aeroméxico Connect
Interjet (defunct)
Magnicharters
Mexicana (defunct)
Volaris

Jalisco
Guadalajara (GDL)
ALMA de Mexico (defunct)
Aeroméxico
Interjet (defunct)
Volaris

Mexico State
Toluca (TLC)
Interjet (defunct)

Nuevo León
Monterrey (MTY)
Aeroméxico
Aladia (defunct)
VivaAerobus

Querétaro
Querétaro (QRO)
TAR Aerolíneas

Quintana Roo
Cancún (CUN)
Aeroméxico Travel (defunct)

United States

Central America

Guatemala
Guatemala City (GUA)
Transportes Aéreos Guatemaltecos

Honduras
La Ceiba (LCE)
Islena Airlines
Aerolíneas Sosa
Tegucigalpa (TGU)
Aerolíneas Sosa

El Salvador
San Salvador (SAL)
Avianca El Salvador

Costa Rica
San José (SJO)
Avianca Costa Rica
Copa Airlines (focus city)

Panama
Panama City (PTY)
Copa Airlines

Caribbean

The Bahamas
Nassau (NAS)
Bahamasair

Barbados
Bridgetown (BGI)
REDjet (defunct)

Cayman Islands
George Town (GCM)
Cayman Airways

Cuba
Havana (HAV)
Cubana

Dominican Republic
Santo Domingo (SDQ)
PAWA Dominicana

Guadeloupe
Pointe-à-Pitre (PTP)
Air Caraïbes
Air Antilles Express
Air France (A320 regional hub)

Jamaica
Kingston (KIN)
Caribbean Airlines

Martinique
Fort-de-France (FDF)
Air Caraïbes

Puerto Rico
Aguadilla (BQN)
Prinair
San Juan (SJU)
Seaborne Airlines
JetBlue Airways
Vieques (VQS)
Vieques Air Link

St. Vincent and the Grenadines 
Kingstown (SVD)
SVG Air
Mustique (MSQ)
Mustique Airways

Trinidad and Tobago
Port of Spain (POS)
Caribbean Airlines

Oceania

Australia
Melbourne (MEL)
Qantas
Jetstar
Virgin Australia
Sydney (SYD)
Jetstar
Qantas
Virgin Australia
Brisbane (BNE)
Jetstar
Qantas
Virgin Australia
Perth (PER)
Virgin Australia Regional Airlines
Qantas
Adelaide (ADL)
Qantas
Rex Airlines
Gold Coast (OOL)
Jetstar
Cebgo
Darwin (DRW)
Airnorth
Jetstar
Cairns (CNS)
Jetstar
Skytrans Airlines

Fiji

Nadi (NAN)
 Fiji Airways

Guam
Hagatna (GUM)
United Airlines

New Zealand

Auckland (AKL)
Air New Zealand
Christchurch (CHC)
Air New Zealand
Wellington (WLG)
Air New Zealand

South America

Argentina
Buenos Aires-Jorge Newbery (AEP)
Aerolíneas Argentinas
Buenos Aires-Ministro Pistarini (EZE)
Aerolíneas Argentinas
Córdoba (COR)
Aerolíneas Argentinas
Salta (SLA)
Andes Líneas Aéreas

Colombia
Bogota (BOG)
Avianca
Copa Airlines Colombia
EasyFly
LAN Colombia
Satena
Wingo
Viva Colombia
Medellín (MDE)
Avianca
Viva Colombia

French Guiana
Cayenne (CAY)
Air Guyane Express

Brazil
São Paulo-Guarulhos (GRU)
TAM
Avianca Brasil
Gol Airlines
São Paulo-Congonhas (CGH)
Gol Airlines
TAM
Brasília (BSB)
Avianca Brasil
Gol Airlines
TAM
Recife (REC)
Azul Brazilian Airlines
Campinas (VCP)
Azul Brazilian Airlines
Rio de Janeiro–Galeão
Gol Airlines
Belo Horizonte (CNF)
Azul Brazilian Airlines
Gol Airlines
Ribeirão Preto (RAO)
Passaredo Airlines

Chile
Santiago (SCL)
LATAM

Ecuador
Quito (UIO)
Avianca Ecuador
LAN Ecuador
Guayaquil (GYE)
LAN Ecuador

Paraguay
Asunción (ASU)
LATAM Paraguay
Amaszonas Paraguay
Sol del Paraguay
Ciudad del Este (AGT)
Sol del Paraguay

Peru
Lima (LIM)
LAN Perú

Trinidad and Tobago
Port of Spain (POS)
Caribbean Airlines
Amerijet

Venezuela 
 Caracas
 Aeropostal
 Aserca Airlines
 Conviasa
 Santa Barbara Airlines
 Venezolana de Aviacion (focus city)
 Vensecar
 Barcelona
 Avior Airlines

References

Airline-related lists